Yerakhta is a rural locality (a selo) in Arkharinsky District, Amur Oblast, Russia. The locality's population is 5 as of 2018.

Geography 
Yerakhta is located on the left bank of the Arkhara River, 20 km east of Arkhara (the district's administrative centre) by road. Zarechnoye is the nearest rural locality.

References

Rural localities in Arkharinsky District